Andy Peterson is an American college football coach. He is currently an assistant coach at Olivet Nazarene University in Bourbonnais, Illinois. Peterson served the head football coach at Maranatha Baptist Bible College in Watertown, Wisconsin from 2011 to 2013.

References

External links
 Oliver Nazarene profile

Year of birth missing (living people)
Living people
American football linebackers
American football safeties
Greenville Panthers football coaches
Maranatha Baptist Bible Sabercats football coaches
Maranatha Baptist Bible Sabercats football players
Olivet Nazarene Tigers football coaches
RiverCity Rage players
Western Michigan Broncos football coaches
College wrestling coaches in the United States
High school football coaches in Wisconsin
Western Michigan University alumni